Nattawut Chootiwat (born June 24, 1999), simply known as Toey, is a Thai professional footballer who plays as a midfielder.

International career
In September 2017, he won the 2017 AFF U-18 Youth Championship with Thailand U19.

Honours

International
Thailand U-19
 AFF U-19 Youth Championship: 2017

External links

1999 births
Living people
Nattawut Chootiwat
Association football midfielders
Nattawut Chootiwat
Nattawut Chootiwat
Nattawut Chootiwat
Nattawut Chootiwat